Odysseus is a character in Greek mythology. 

Odysseus may also refer to:
 Odysseus (crater), a crater on Tethys, a moon of Saturn
 Odysseus (e-mail client), an email program based on Eudora
 Odysseus (polychaete), a genus of polychaete worms, in the family Terebellidae
 1143 Odysseus, an asteroid
 Ulysses (spacecraft), a NASA and ESA spaceprobe studying the Sun
  Odysseus, a secular oratorio by Max Bruch (1873)
 The Odyssey (TV miniseries) (1997)
 Odysseus (role-playing game), 1980 role-playing game
 Odysseus (Jesse Jagz album), 2017

See also 
 
 
 Ulysses (disambiguation), the Latin form of the name

cy:Ulysses